This is a list of colonial and departmental heads of Réunion. Réunion is a French overseas department and region with a population of about 800,000 located in the Indian Ocean, east of Madagascar, approximately 200 km southwest of Mauritius, the nearest island. The chief of state is the French President, who is represented by a Prefect. The president of the General Council acts as head of the government. Elections held in Réunion include the French presidential vote. A prefect is appointed by the president on the advice of the French Ministry of the Interior. The presidents of the General and Regional Councils are elected by members of those councils.

List of officeholders

(Dates in italics indicate de facto continuation of office)

See also
 Politics of Réunion
 History of Réunion

External links
 World Statesmen – Réunion

Politicians of Réunion
Prefects of Réunion
Reunion
Colonial and Departmental Heads